The Royal Norwegian Ministry of Pay and Prices was a Norwegian ministry that existed from 1955 to 1972.

It was established on 1 August 1955. It ceased to exist on 7 May 1972, its tasks were mainly transferred to the Ministry of Family and Consumer Affairs.

The heads of the Ministry of Pay and Prices were Gunnar Bråthen (1955-1959), Gunnar Bøe (1959-1962), Karl Trasti (1962-1963), Ole Myrvoll (1963), Karl Trasti (1963-1964), Idar Norstrand (1964-1965), Dagfinn Vårvik (1965-1971) and Olav Gjærevoll (1971-1972).

List of ministers

Key

Ministers

References

Pay and Prices
1955 establishments in Norway
1972 disestablishments in Norway
Ministries established in 1955